Histology and Histopathology is a monthly peer-reviewed medical journal publishing original and review articles in the fields of histology and histopathology. It was established in 1986 and is published by the University of Murcia in Spain. The editors-in-chief are Francisco Hernández and Juan F. Madrid (University of Murcia). According to the Journal Citation Reports, the journal has a 2016 impact factor of 2.025.

References

External links

Histopathology
Pathology journals
Anatomy journals
Publications established in 1986
Quarterly journals
University of Murcia
English-language journals